The nuclear receptor co-repressor 1 also known as thyroid-hormone- and retinoic-acid-receptor-associated co-repressor 1 (TRAC-1) is a protein that in humans is encoded by the NCOR1 gene.

NCOR1 is a transcriptional coregulatory protein which contains several nuclear receptor interacting domains.  In addition,  NCOR1 appears to recruit histone deacetylases to DNA promoter regions.  Hence NCOR1 assists nuclear receptors in the down regulation of gene expression.

Loss of function of this protein significantly increases the strength and power of mouse muscles.

Family
It is a member of the family of nuclear receptor corepressors; the other human protein that is a member of that family is Nuclear receptor co-repressor 2.

Interactions 
Nuclear receptor co-repressor 1 has been shown to interact with:

 Androgen receptor, 
 CHD1, 
 Calcitriol receptor 
 GPS2, 
 Glucocorticoid receptor, 
 HDAC3, 
 HDAC4, 
 HDAC7A, 
 HDAC9, 
 HEY2, 
 Histone deacetylase 5, 
 MAP3K7IP2, 
 MECP2, 
 Peroxisome proliferator-activated receptor alpha, 
 Peroxisome proliferator-activated receptor gamma
 Promyelocytic leukemia protein,
 RUNX1T1, 
 Retinoic acid receptor alpha, 
 Retinoic acid receptor gamma, 
 SAP30, 
 TBL1XR1, 
 TBL1X,  and
 ZBTB33.

Further reading

External links 
 
 
 

Transcription coregulators